Cabinet of Ana Brnabić may refer to:

 First cabinet of Ana Brnabić
 Second cabinet of Ana Brnabić
 Third cabinet of Ana Brnabić